Susan Bell may refer to:

 Susan Bell (bishop), bishop of Niagara
 Susan Groag Bell (1926–2015), Czech-American pioneer in women's studies
 Susan Bell (curler)